Chesterfield is a market town and unparished area in the Borough of Chesterfield, Derbyshire, England,  north of Derby and  south of Sheffield at the confluence of the River Rother and River Hipper. In 2011 the built-up-area subdivision had a population of 88,483, making it the second-largest settlement in Derbyshire, after Derby. The wider borough had a population of 103,801 in 2011. In 2011, the town had a population of 76,753. It has been traced to a transitory Roman fort of the 1st century CE. The name of the later Anglo-Saxon village comes from the Old English ceaster (Roman fort) and feld (pasture). It has a sizeable street market three days a week. The town sits on an old coalfield, but little visual evidence of mining remains. The main landmark is the crooked spire of the Church of St Mary and All Saints.

History
Chesterfield was in the Hundred of Scarsdale. The town received its market charter in 1204 from King John, which constituted the town as a free borough, granting the burgesses of Chesterfield the privileges of those of Nottingham and Derby. In 1266, the Battle of Chesterfield saw a band of rebel barons defeated by a royalist army.

Elizabeth I granted a charter in either 1594 or 1598, creating a corporation of a mayor, six aldermen, six brethren, and twelve capital burgesses. This remained its charter until the borough was reshaped under the Municipal Corporations Act 1835. It originally consisted only of the township of Chesterfield but absorbed some surrounding townships in 1892. There was a major extension when the borough absorbed New Whittington and Newbold urban district in 1920. Chesterfield's current boundaries date from 1 April 1974, when the Borough of Chesterfield was formed under the Local Government Act 1972 by amalgamating the municipal borough of Chesterfield, the urban district of Staveley and the parish of Brimington from Chesterfield Rural District.

Chesterfield benefited much from the building of the Chesterfield Line – part of the Derby to Leeds railway (North Midland Line) begun in 1837 by George Stephenson. During the work, a sizeable seam of coal was discovered while the Clay Cross Tunnel was constructed. This and the local ironstone were exploited by Stephenson, who set up a company in Clay Cross to trade in the minerals.

During his time in Chesterfield, Stephenson lived at Tapton House, remaining there until his death in 1848. He is interred in Trinity Church. A statue of him was erected outside Chesterfield railway station in 2006.

Governance
Local government in Chesterfield has a two-tier structure. At the upper tier of services such as consumer protection, education, main roads and social services is provided by Derbyshire County Council. At the lower tier, housing, planning, refuse collection and burial grounds are provided by Chesterfield Borough Council. The borough is unparished with the exceptions of Brimington and Staveley, whose councils perform limited functions in their areas.

County council
Derbyshire County Council has 64 elected county councillors, each for a single-member electoral division. The entire council is elected every four years. In June 2009, the Conservative Party took control from the Labour Party after 28 years. Derbyshire County Council returned to Labour control at the 2013 local elections, but reverted to Conservative control after the 2017 county council elections, when the number of Conservative seats rose from 18 to 37 – a ten-seat majority.

Coat of arms
The borough council uses armorial bearings originally granted to the previous borough corporation by letters patent dated 10 November 1955. The blazon of the arms is as follows:

Gules a Device representing a Pomegranate Tree as depicted on the ancient Common Seal of the Borough the tree leaved and eradicated proper flowered and fructed Or and for the Crest on a Wreath of the Colours Issuant from a Mural Crown Gules Masoned Or a Mount Vert thereon a Derby Ram passant guardant proper.
Supporters: On the dexter side a Cock and on the sinister side a Pynot or Magpie proper each Ducally gorged Or

The shield is based on the borough's ancient common seal, believed to date from the earlier 16th century. The seal depicts a stylised pomegranate tree. When the arms were formally granted, the College of Arms expressed the view that the plant had been adopted by the town as a symbol of loyalty to the crown, as it had been a royal badge used by Katherine of Aragon, Henry VIII and Mary Tudor. The crest depicts a Derby Ram, representing the county of Derbyshire, and a mural crown, suggestive of a town wall and thus borough status. The supporters represent the Cock and Pynot Inn, Old Whittington. The now Cock and Magpie Inn (53°16'13.1"N 1°25'34.3"W) is next to Revolution House, which was the site of a meeting between conspirators against James II in 1688. Among those meeting there were the Earl of Danby and Devonshire, marked by ducal crowns round the supporters' necks. The two birds stand on a compartment of rocks and moorland. The motto is "Aspire", a punning reference to the crooked spire of the parish church.

Combined authority
The borough council began in March 2016 an attempt to join the Sheffield City Region Combined Authority, which is due to receive devolved powers. Derbyshire County Council opposed this and was seeking legal advice on whether the matter could be taken to judicial review. Chesterfield Council has since withdrawn its application, but remains a non-constituent member.

Geography
Chesterfield lies at the confluence of the River Rother and River Hipper at the Nottinghamshire, Derbyshire and Yorkshire Coalfield, in the eastern foothills of the Pennines. It is sometimes described as the "Gateway to the Peak", with the Peak District National Park to the west of the town.

Nearby areas of the South and West Yorkshire Green Belt can serve to block urban sprawl. Other local greenfield frameworks include "strategic gaps" to maintain the openness and landscape qualities of large open areas, and "green wedges" penetrating urban areas with recreational facilities.

Built-up area
The Chesterfield built-up area extends outside of the borough boundaries into the neighbouring North East Derbyshire district and includes the town of Staveley and the villages of Wingerworth, Holymoorside, Calow and Cutthorpe. It had a population of 113,000 according to the 2011 census.

Economy
Since the cessation of coal mining, the economy around Chesterfield has undergone major change. The employment base has moved from the primary and secondary sectors towards the tertiary. The area sits on an old, large coalfield which had many collieries, including those in outlying areas which were historically part of Chesterfield Rural District: Clay Cross, Arkwright Town, Bolsover, Grassmoor, North Wingfield and Holmewood.

Between 1981 and 2002, 15,000 jobs in the coal industry were lost and not one colliery remains open, although open cast mining took place at Arkwright Town for a few years from November 1993. Many mine sites were restored by a contractor for Derbyshire County Council. Little evidence of mining remains. A cyclists' and walkers' route, the "Five Pits Trail", links some former mines; most are now indistinguishable from the surrounding countryside.

In the town, large factories and major employers have disappeared or relocated. Markham & Co. manufactured tunnel boring machines such as the one used for the Channel Tunnel. It was bought out by Norway's Kvaerner and later merged with Sheffield-based Davy. Its factory on Hollis Lane is now a housing estate; the former offices were turned into flats and serviced office suites. Dema Glass's factory near Lockoford Lane closed; the site is now host to a Tesco supermarket and the Proact Stadium, the home of Chesterfield Football Club. GKN closed its factory and the site is being turned into a business park.

Other companies have downsized sharply. Robinson's, makers of paper-based packaging, divested its health-care interests, which led to a marked fall in the workforce and facilities in Chesterfield. Trebor, once based on Brimington Road near Chesterfield railway station, merged with Bassetts sweets of Sheffield, was later taken over by Cadbury and relocated to a modern unit at Holmewood business park. The earlier factory has been demolished and the site awaits development.

Chesterfield Cylinders relocated to a smaller site in Sheffield. Chesterfield Cylinders' Derby Road site is now Alma Leisure Park, which includes a Nuffield Health Club, Cineworld, Frankie & Benny's, McDonald's, Dunkin' Donuts, Taco Bell
a Harvester Pub and a Nando's. Their former factory on Derby Road is now Spire Walk Business Park, a B&Q Mini warehouse, a Toys R Us and Chesterfield's new fire station.

Manufacturing employment has fallen by a third since 1991, though the proportion of employees in manufacturing is still above the national average, underlining how critical it has been to Chesterfield. Today, smaller firms are found on several industrial estates, the largest being at Sheepbridge. Business located on the estate includes SIG plc subsidiary Warren Insulations, Franke Sisons Ltd (founded in 1784 in Sheffield and among the first to manufacture stainless steel kitchen sinks in the 1930s), Rhodes Group and Chesterfield Felt.

Between the A61 and Brimington Road there is a  development site resulting from Arnold Laver relocating to a modern sawmill at Halfway, near Sheffield. The former sawmill has been demolished, with outline planning permission given for a mixed residential and commercial development to be called Chesterfield Waterside, built around a new marina at the end of the Chesterfield Canal, which currently terminates at an adjacent weir.

There is a Morrisons on the junction of Chatsworth Road (A619) and Walton Road (A632), a Sainsburys on Rother Way (A619 for Staveley), and a Tesco Extra on the junction of the A619 and A61 (known locally as Tesco Roundabout). The Institute of Business Advisers is based on Queen Street North. Chesterfield Royal Hospital is on the A632 towards Calow and Bolsover. It has the only accident and emergency department in Derbyshire outside Derby.

Peak FM broadcast from Sheepbridge on 107.4 MHz FM and 102 MHz FM via the nearby Chesterfield transmitting station until September 2020, in which it was replacing by Greatest Hits Radio. The transmitting site also hosts BBC Radio Sheffield on 94.7 MHz FM. DAB transmissions for Chesterfield come from there, but only Digital One is currently broadcast. The local television stations are ITV Yorkshire, BBC Yorkshire and Sheffield Live TV, which broadcast from Leeds and Sheffield. Also in the town are the headquarters of the Derbyshire Times, the local newspaper, which does not cover all of the county. Spire Radio serves the local community, broadcasting online.

The Chesterfield and North Derbyshire Branch of the RSPCA is located in the town, and serves the North East Derbyshire area. The centre, which is not government funded, holds money-raising events that include a summer Dog Show.

The town's biggest employer is now the "Royal Mail/Post Office" administration department in newly built offices on the edge of the town centre. The Royal Mail's Pensions Service Centre is near the town in Boythorpe Road, in Rowland Hill House, which also serves other administrative functions. There is a Post Office Ltd building in the town at West Bars called Future Walk. Formerly this was Chetwynd House, now demolished and replaced by the new building.

Shopping, entertainment and leisure

The town centre of Chesterfield has retained much of its pre-war plan. It has one of the largest open-air markets in Britain, the stalls sitting either side of the Market Hall. In the middle of town, a collection of narrow medieval streets makes up The Shambles, which houses the Royal Oak, one of Britain's oldest pubs.

Near Holywell Cross is what was (until 2013) Chesterfield's largest department store, the Co-operative or Co-op. The main building opened in 1938, and now occupies the majority of Elder Way, including an enclosed bridge, and part of Knifesmithgate. Here the façade is in the mock-Tudor style fashionable in the 1930s, which still dominates the north side of Knifesmithgate. In 2001, the Chesterfield and District Co-operative Society was incorporated into a larger regional Midlands Co-operative Society Limited, now the biggest independent retail society in the UK. Owing to a decline in retail sales, the large home and fashion Co-op department store closed at the end of July 2013, The area is being redeveloped with restaurants, a hotel and a gym and due to open in 2019.

The Pavements

In the late 1970s a large area between Low Pavement (in the Market Square) and New Beetwell Street was demolished (except the original shop fronts) to build "The Pavements" shopping centre, known by some as The Precinct, which was opened in November 1981 by the Prince and Princess of Wales. It has entrances opposite Chesterfield Market and escalators leading down to New Beetwell St and the bus station. An enclosed bridge links the site to a multi-storey car park built at the same time, adjacent to the town's coach station.

Chesterfield's multi-storey library stands just outside The Pavements in New Beetwell St. The building was opened in 1985. In annual figures compiled by the Chartered Institute of Public Finance and Accountancy it ranked fifth in the UK for number of loans in 2008, rising one place on the previous year. The area beside the library was redeveloped, but retains the old narrow passageways while accommodating small shop units and offices.

On 27 June 2007, the Somerfield store in the Precinct was gutted in a fire in which the roof collapsed. Only a few shoppers suffered minor injuries. The fire reportedly started after a welding torch being used to repair flood damage had been left ignited. It started at 13:10 on 27 June and was not extinguished until 23:30 that day. All shops in The Pavements were closed and evacuated. Other areas including the Market Hall were later evacuated as the smoke became worse. After the fire, Somerfield decided to cease trading in Chesterfield. The unit re-opened in September 2008 as a Tesco Metro store.

Vicar Lane

Vicar Lane was redeveloped in 2000 as a pedestrianised open-air shopping centre. This meant demolishing almost all of the existing buildings, including a Woolworths branch and a small bus station. The project was so large that two new shopping streets were created. It now includes major chains such as H&M and Argos. The development had been planned in the 1980s but delayed for economic reasons. A multi-storey car park on Beetwell St was added under the revised plan. The area lies between the Pavements Centre and markets and the crooked spire.

Food and drink
Cuisine available in the area includes Chinese, Italian, Japanese, Indian and Thai restaurants and takeaways. Several late-night venues are located around the town, mainly in the Church Way, Holywell Street and Corporation Street areas. Venues offer cocktails and selections of world beers, while others in Corporation Street aim for a younger, more party-orientated crowd. Around the town there are many other bars and pubs. The Brampton Mile west of the town centre offers 13 pubs on a  section of Chatsworth Road.

In February 2006, the first international gluten free beer festival was held in Chesterfield. The Campaign for Real Ale (CAMRA) hosted the event as part of its regular beer festival in the town.

The arts
The Winding Wheel, hitherto an Odeon Cinema, is a venue for concerts, exhibitions, conferences, dinners, family parties, dances, banquets, wedding receptions, meetings, product launches and lectures. Past notable performers include Bob Geldof, The Proclaimers and Paddy McGuinness. Chesterfield Symphony Orchestra give three concerts a year there.

The "Pomegranate Theatre", formerly the Chesterfield Civic Theatre and previously the Stephenson Memorial Theatre) is a listed Victorian building in what is now known as the Stephenson Memorial Hall, with an auditorium that seats about 500 people. Shows are given throughout the year. Also in the Stephenson Memorial Hall is the Chesterfield Museum, opened in 1994. Until 1984 it was used as the town's main library. The museum is owned by Chesterfield Borough Council, as are the Winding Wheel and the Pomegranate Theatre. The box office for both venues is located in the entrance area of the theatre.

The Royal Mail building, Future Walk, in West Bars, was once the site of Chetwynd House, referred to locally as the AGD. Here a work by sculptor Barbara Hepworth Carved Reclining Form or Rosewall was prominently displayed for many years and nicknamed Isaiah by local critics, as it resembled a crude human face with one eye higher than the other ("eye's 'igher"). The work was due to be sold in 2005, but reprieved as a work of national significance. Other artworks of note include A System of Support and Balance by Paul Lewthwaite, outside Chesterfield Magistrates' Court.

Transport

Roads
The town is located on the A61,  from the M1.

Junction 29 of the M1 motorway at Heath links Chesterfield to the motorway network to the south via the A617 dual carriageway. Junction 29a at Markham Vale, Duckmanton, opened at the end of June 2008. The town also has links to the M1 at Junction 30 and to the north via the A619. Other major roads include the A61 Sheffield Road (north)/Derby Road (south), with a dual carriageway from the town centre right into Sheffield, and the A619, a major entry to the Peak District, eventually joining the A6 near Bakewell) and the A632 to Matlock.

Road transport

Stagecoach, through their East Midlands and Yorkshire divisions, are the predominant operator of buses in Chesterfield; other operators include Hulleys of Baslow, Trentbarton and TM Travel. Buses stop in several areas around the town centre rather than at a central bus station. The Stagecoach depot at Stonegravels is notable for its size and many vehicles stored there are not in regular use. Formerly it was the Chesterfield Corporation bus depot.

A new coach station opened in 2005 on the site of the old bus station, served by Stagecoach and National Express coaches.

The main taxi ranks are in Elder Way and Knifesmithgate and outside the railway station. Chesterfield taxis are recognisably black with distinctive white bonnets and boots.

Railways
Chesterfield railway station lies on the Midland Main Line. Its three train companies are:
East Midlands Railway to London St Pancras, Nottingham, Derby, Sheffield, Leeds, Liverpool and Norwich
CrossCountry to Newcastle, Edinburgh,  Reading, Bournemouth, Plymouth and Penzance
Northern Trains to Leeds and Nottingham

Chesterfield once had two other railway stations:
Chesterfield Market Place was closed in 1951 due to the prohibitive cost of maintaining Bolsover Tunnel and the nearby Doe Lea Viaduct, both affected by mining subsidence. It had been the terminus of the Chesterfield–Lincoln line built in 1897 by the Lancashire, Derbyshire and East Coast Railway (LD&ECR). No original buildings remain. The site is now owned by the Post Office.
Chesterfield Central closed in 1963, in conjunction with a general wind-down of passenger train activity on the Great Central Railway (GCR). Chesterfield's inner relief road, part of the A61, now runs along some of the disused track bed. The station was demolished in 1973.

The railways crossed each other at Horns Bridge, the Midland Main Line passing over the GCR loop into Chesterfield and the LD&ECR passing both on a  viaduct. Horns Bridge has been redeveloped since the last two railways closed. Horns Bridge Roundabout on the A61 Derby Road and A617 Lordsmill Street now occupies the site. The viaduct was demolished in the 1970s.

Chesterfield also had a tramway system, built in 1882 and closed in 1927.

Air
The nearest licensed airfield is Netherthorpe Aerodrome near Worksop in Nottinghamshire, but has only 553 metres of grass runway. Air passengers may use East Midlands, Leeds Bradford, Doncaster Sheffield, Manchester and Birmingham airports, all within two hours by road.

Canal
The Chesterfield Canal linked the town to a national network of waterways through the 19th century. Overtaken by rail and then road for freight transport, it fell into disuse, but has been partially restored since the mid-20th century for leisure use. However, the section through Chesterfield remains isolated from the rest of the waterway network.

Media
Television is provided by BBC Yorkshire and ITV Yorkshire so Chesterfield receives news from the Yorkshire region. Unless connected to Virgin Media where the feed is from their Nottingham hub so receives BBC East Midlands and ITV Central areas as the default.

Radio stations are BBC Radio Sheffield and Greatest Hits Radio Yorkshire (which used to be Peak FM) and the local internet radio stations S41 Radio, Elastic FM, Chesterfield Radio and Spire Radio

Education
The borough of Chesterfield has many schools in it.

Primary schools
 Hady Primary School
 Hasland Junior School 
 Duckmanton Primary School 
 Old Hall Junior School
 Brockwell Junior School
 St Mary's Catholic Primary 
 Abercrombie Primary School
 Brimington Junior School
 Holme Hall Primary School
 Mary Swanwick Primary School
 Newbold CofE Primary School
 Dunston Primary and Nursery Academy 
 William Rhodes Primary and Nursery School
 Christ Church CofE Primary School
 Highfield Hall Primary School 
 Hollingwood Primary School
 Cavendish Junior School
 Whitecoates Primary School 
 Brampton Primary School 
 Stavely Junior School
 Inkersall Spencer Academy 
 Poolsbrook Primary Academy
 St Joseph's Catholic and CofE (VA) Primary School 
 Spire Junior School 
 Walton Peak Flying High Academy

Secondary schools
 Brookfield Community School
 Parkside Community School
 Netherthorpe School
 Outwood Academy Hasland Hall
 Outwood Academy Newbold
 Springwell Community College
 Whittington Green School
 St Mary's Catholic High School - A Roman Catholic School.

Colleges
 Chesterfield College

Religious sites

Chesterfield is perhaps best known for the crooked spire of its Church of Saint Mary and All Saints and is why the local football team is known as The Spireites.

The spire is twisted 45 degrees and leans  from its true centre. Folklore recounts that a Bolsover blacksmith mis-shod the Devil, who leapt over the spire in pain, knocking it out of shape. Realistically, the lean has been ascribed to an absence of skilled craftsmen just 12 years after the Black Death, the use of unseasoned timber, or insufficient cross-bracing. The bend follows the direction of the sun and has been caused by heat expansion and a weight for which it was not designed. The tower on which the spire sits contains ten bells cast in 1947 by the Whitechapel Bell Foundry in London, replacing a previous ring. The heaviest weighs .

Also in Chesterfield is the Annunciation Church, founded by the Jesuits in 1854 and designed by Joseph Hansom.

Sport and leisure

Football
Chesterfield is home to the National League club Chesterfield, which formerly played at the Recreation Ground (usually referred to as Saltergate after the road on which it was located). The team is nicknamed the Spireites, after the crooked spire of St Mary's Church. In 2005, plans were announced to build a new stadium on the old Dema Glass site north of the town in Whittington Moor. Construction of the new stadium began in summer 2009 and was completed for the 2010–2011 season. Originally known as the b2net Stadium, it was renamed the Proact Stadium in 2012 and has been known as the Technique Stadium since 2020. The team has a rivalry with Mansfield Town. In April 1997, Chesterfield reached the semi-finals of the FA Cup, losing to Middlesbrough in a replay after a 3–3 draw at Old Trafford. There was controversy over Chesterfield scoring a goal not given by referee David Elleray, who decided the ball had not crossed the goal line from a Jonathan Howard shot; video replays showed this was incorrect. Had the goal stood, the club might have progressed to the final of the FA Cup for the first time in its history – a feat which no club in the third tier of the league has yet achieved. In 2006, Chesterfield beat Premier League heavyweights Manchester City and West Ham to reach the last 16 of the League Cup, where it was narrowly beaten on penalties by Charlton Athletic. Despite its League Cup exploits, Chesterfield was relegated on the penultimate game of the season.

Chesterfield Ladies FC have women's and girls' teams and is based at Queen's Park Annexe; it plays in the Sheffield and Hallamshire Girls County League.

The town also has an amateur Sunday football league that hosts over 100 teams on a Sunday morning. The Chesterfield and District Sunday Football League consists of nine divisions and three cup competitions.

Rugby
Chesterfield Panthers Rugby Union Football Club was formed in 1919 and played its first game in 1920. It fields three men's senior squads, a senior ladies squad and numerous junior teams. They moved for the 2013/2014 season to a new purpose-built ground on the outskirts, at 2012 Dunston Road, from their former Stonegravels site. The facilities include three pitches, one floodlit, numerous changing rooms, and a large open-plan bar area. The first XV won the Midlands North 4 championship in 2013/2014 and returned to the Midlands North 3 for the first time in 25 years. The second XV won the Notts, Lincs & Derbyshire RFU Competition. The sparked extra interest in the club and the game. It has become a nurturing ground for players who move to professional level in such clubs as Northampton Saints and London Wasps.

Chesterfield Spires RLFC is a rugby league club formed in the town in 2003 and currently playing in the RL Merit League. In 2008 it merged with the North Derbyshire Chargers.

Cricket
Chesterfield Cricket Club is an English amateur cricket club, that is based on Queen's Park. and has a history that dates back to the mid 18th century.  Chesterfield CC compete in the Derbyshire County Cricket League; the top level for recreational club cricket in Derbyshire, England, and is a designated ECB Premier League. Chesterfield were League Champions in 2008 and are only one of three clubs that have remained in the top flight of the League since it was created in 1999.

The club have three senior teams that compete on Saturdays in the Derbyshire County Cricket League, a Sunday XI in the Mansfield and District Cricket League and an established junior training section that play competitive cricket in the North Derbyshire Youth Cricket League.

Hockey
Chesterfield Hockey Club, founded in 1899, competes in the Yorkshire and North East Region Hockey League. The side has typically been mid-table or battled against relegation until its greatest success, when it recruited the Australian import striker Adam Clifford from Tasmania. During his two seasons Clifford scored over 50 goals and Chesterfield narrowly lost the league in the final weeks by a single point.

Athletics
Chesterfield & District Athletic Club are based at Tupton Hall School, Tupton, Chesterfield, and provides training and events for juniors and seniors.

Swimming

Chesterfield Swimming Club, the largest competitive swimming club in North Derbyshire, is based at the Queen's Park Sports Centre in Boythorpe Road. In October 2011 it began delivering the programme for Derventio eXcel (Performance Swim Squad for Derbyshire) for the North East of the county. In 2012, Chesterfield SC took part in the Arena National Swimming League and achieved promotion to the top division at the first attempt. Further success raised its membership.

Tennis
Chesterfield Lawn Tennis Club are members of the Sheffield and District League, and is the largest Tennis centre in North Derbyshire with 3 Indoor and 7 Outdoor Courts.

Golf
Chesterfield Golf Club was founded in 1897, and is an 18-hole golf course situated near Walton, Chesterfield.

Queen's Park
Queen's Park, just outside the town centre, recently benefited from a multimillion-pound programme of investment, allowing it to host county cricket again. Alderman T P Wood, Mayor of Chesterfield in 1886 proposed that local land be acquired by the Local Board to create a public park for the Golden Jubilee of Queen Victoria in 1887. It officially opened in 1893. The park includes a cricket field, pavilion, lake, conservatory, bandstand, and miniature railway. A further  of land south of the park was acquired as a memorial to Queen Victoria in 1901 and laid out as a recreation ground known as Queen's Park Annex.

Queen's Park Sports Centre
Queens Park Sports Centre was constructed in the mid and late 20th century within Queen's Park, adjacent to its western boundary. It included a swimming pool, gym, several indoor courts (for various sports) and several more outdoor tennis courts, before it was closed in December 2015.

A new £11.2 million Queen's Park Sports Centre opened in January 2016 on the Queen's Park Annex south of Queen's Park. It includes an eight-lane swimming pool, a learner pool, a gym, an eight-court sports hall, squash courts, training rooms, an exercise-class studio, a climbing wall and a café.

Healthy Living Centre, Staveley
The Healthy Living Centre at Staveley opened in Spring 2008. It has a  swimming pool with a movable platform, an  climbing wall, leisure facilities such as an indoor children's soft-play area, crèche facilities, a fitness suite, health spa and dance studios.

Skate park
A  skate park, built by Freestyle, opened in June 2009 on land behind Ravenside Retail Park and B&Q, near Horns Bridge.

A speedway training track once operated at Glasshouse Farm in the early 1950s.

Public services
Chesterfield is policed by Derbyshire Constabulary. Chesterfield Police Station in New Beetwell St is the Division 'C' Headquarters, with local police stations in Bolsover, Clay Cross, Dronfield, Killamarsh, Newbold, Staveley, and Shirebrook.

In health care, Chesterfield has two NHS hospitals, Chesterfield Royal Hospital NHS Foundation Trust in Calow, with maternity services and accident and emergency department, and the smaller Walton Hospital run by Derbyshire Healthcare NHS Foundation Trust. In 1984, the entire site of the old Chesterfield Royal Hospital in the town centre was purchased by an orthopaedic surgeon, who converted the lower portion of the hospital, adjoining Infirmary Road and Durrant Road, into the Alexandra Private Hospital.

As with the rest of Derbyshire, Chesterfield is covered by the East Midlands Ambulance Service (EMAS) and the Derbyshire, Leicestershire & Rutland Air Ambulance.

Chesterfield is served by Derbyshire Fire and Rescue Service, which has fire stations in Chesterfield, Clay Cross, Clowne and Staveley. Chesterfield fire station moved from Whittington Moor to a newly built station located behind B&Q at Horns Bridge.

Notable people
Notable people from Chesterfield in alphabetical order. Information not referenced on the person's page must be referenced here.
Olave Baden-Powell (1889–1977), wife of Robert Baden-Powell and Chief Guide from 1918
Ben Barnicoat (born 1996), racing driver
Steven Blakeley (born 1982), actor in television drama series Heartbeat
B. V. Bowden, Baron Bowden (1910–1989), scientist and educationist, associated with the development of UMIST as a university
Tommy Briggs (1923–1984), professional footballer and football manager
Paul Burrell (born 1958), former royal butler and author
Martyn P. Casey (born 1960), bassist with The Bad Seeds and formerly Grinderman
Barbara Castle (1910–2002), Labour cabinet minister
Paul Cummins (born 1977), artist, creator of Blood Swept Lands and Seas of Red
Jonno Davies (born 1992), actor
Fred Davis (1913–1998), snooker player
Richard Dawson (1960–2020), professional footballer with Rotherham United, Doncaster Rovers and Chesterfield
Connor Dimaio (born 1996), professional footballer
Blair Dunlop (born 1992), musician and actor
Stanley Dyson (1920–2007), art teacher and Outsider Art contributor
Jane Freeman (1871–1963), artist
Francis Frith (1822–1898), photographer and liberal Quaker
Thomas Gascoyne (1876–1917), professional cyclist professional cyclist, who set world records for both 25 miles and the flying start quarter-mile. He rode in Europe, America and Australia but died at the Battle of Passchendaele
Jeff Gilberthorpe (born 1939), wildlife artist and author
Diego De Girolamo (born 1995), professional footballer
Simon Groom (born 1950), Blue Peter children's television programme presenter
Jo Guest (born 1972), former glamour model and Page Three girl
Lisa Hall (living), musician
W. E. Harvey, Lib/Lab Member of Parliament (MP)
Sir John Hurt (1940–2017), actor, knighted in 2015 for services to drama 
Nigel Illingworth (born 1960), first-class cricketer
Gwen John (1878–1953), playwright and author
Winifred Jones (died 1955), suffragist
Jeremy Kemp (1935–2019), actor in the television series Z-Cars
Thomas Latimer (born 1986), WWE wrestler under the stage name Kenneth Cameron
Frank Lee (1867–1941), Labour Party MP
Matthew Lowton (born 1989), professional footballer
John Lukic (born 1960), professional footballer
Rik Makarem (born 1982), actor in TV soap opera Emmerdale
Geoff Miller (born 1952), England cricketer
Violet Markham (1872–1959), writer, social reformer and first female Mayor of Chesterfield
Henry Normal (born 1956), writer, poet and television producer
Paul Patterson (born 1947), composer and Royal Academy of Music professor
Johnny Pearson, composer of television theme tunes and pianist
Samuel Pegge (1704–1796), antiquary and Vicar of Old Whittington
Toby Perkins (born 1970), British Labour Party politician, MP for Chesterfield since 2010 and Shadow Business Minister
Claire Price (born 1972), stage and television actress
Sir Robert Robinson, Nobel Prize in Chemistry for his work on plant dyestuffs (anthocyanins) and alkaloids
Lee Rowley (born 1980), Conservative MP for North East Derbyshire
Sir Robin Saxby (4 February 1947), technology entrepreneur, retired founding CEO of Arm Holdings
Joe Screen (born 1972), international speedway rider
Mark Shaw (born 1961), lead singer of 1980s band Then Jerico
Rose Smith (1891–1985), communist activist and union official
Phil "Philthy Animal" Taylor (1954–2015), Motörhead drummer
Percy Toplis (1896–1920), criminal active in the 1910s
Eric Varley (1932–2008), Labour Member of Parliament (MP) for Chesterfield, cabinet minister, and Chairman of Coalite
Mike Watterson (1942–2019), professional snooker player and television commentator
Mark Webber (born 1970), rock guitarist in the band Pulp and curator of avant-garde cinema
Bob Wilson, international footballer and broadcaster
Luke Wordsworth (died 1643), Royalist cavalry soldier in the English Civil War who served under Prince Rupert of the Rhine and was killed by Roundhead forces the Battle of Aylesbury
Peter Wright (1916–1995), MI5 officer and author of Spycatcher

Other prominent connections:
Gordon Banks (1937–2019), England's World Cup winning goalkeeper played for Chesterfield between 1955 and 1959
Tony Benn (1925–2014), Labour MP for Chesterfield from 1984 to 2001
Sir Montague Burton (1885–1952), founder of the Burton chain, which opened his first store in Chesterfield in 1903
Geoff Capes (born 1949), twice winner of the World's Strongest Man competition, used to live in Chesterfield.
The Venerable Edmond Francis Crosse (1858–1941), Vicar of Chesterfield and then first Archdeacon of Chesterfield
Erasmus Darwin, (1731–1802), one of the founders of the Lunar Society, a discussion group of pioneering industrialists and natural philosophers, was educated at Chesterfield School.
John Lowe (born 1945), former professional darts player, three-time darts World Champion
Alfred Seaman (1844–1910), Victorian photographer, opened his first studio in the town.
George Stephenson (1781–1848), engineer behind the world's first public railway hauled by steam, ended his days at Tapton House, now a Chesterfield College campus.
Ben Slater (born 1991), professional cricketer for Derbyshire, then Nottinghamshire

Twinnings

Arms

See also
Listed buildings in Chesterfield, Derbyshire
Chesterfield Canal Trust
Walton Hall
Chesterfield power station

References

External links

Chesterfield Borough Council

Chesterfield Canal History Archive
Chesterfield by Destination Chesterfield

 
Towns in Derbyshire
Market towns in Derbyshire
Populated places established in the 1st century
Roman sites in Derbyshire
Towns and villages of the Peak District
Unparished areas in Derbyshire